"Karma Man" is a song written and recorded by English singer-songwriter David Bowie. It was recorded on 1 September 1967 at Advision Studios in London and marked the beginning of Bowie's working relationship with producer Tony Visconti, which would last for the rest of the artist's career. The song expresses Bowie's growing interest in Tibetan Buddhism, concerning a character who is put on display as a "freak" in a carnival tent. The music reflects the Buddhist themes and was likened to the works of the Beatles. Initially proposed as a B-side, it remained unreleased until The World of David Bowie compilation in March 1970. Bowie performed the song during two of his BBC radio sessions, one of which was released on the 2000 compilation Bowie at the Beeb.

Suede used "Karma Man" as an influence for their singles "The Drowners" and "Beautiful Ones". Bowie remade the song during the sessions for the Toy project in mid-2000, along with other tracks he wrote and recorded during the mid-1960s, including the song's original intended A-side "Let Me Sleep Beside You". The remake saw an official release in 2021 with the entire project as part of the Brilliant Adventure (1992–2001) box set.

Background and recording

After the commercial failure of his self-titled debut album (1967) and singles for Deram Records, David Bowie's manager Kenneth Pitt proposed he change producers. Denny Cordell turned the offer down but suggested his assistant Tony Visconti, a New Yorker who had worked with the Move and Manfred Mann. Bowie and Visconti became immediate friends, which the former attributed in 1976 to their mutual interests in Tibetan Buddhism. Visconti agreed to produce and arrange his next prospective single for Deram, marking the beginning of a working relationship that would last for the rest of Bowie's career. According to biographer Chris O'Leary, Bowie needed a producer who shared similar interests and working methods rather than established producers he had worked with previously, such as Tony Hatch and Mike Vernon.

According to biographer Nicholas Pegg, Bowie reportedly wrote "Karma Man", along with "Let Me Sleep Beside You", after he had a desire to write "some top ten rubbish". With Visconti producing and playing bass, the two tracks were recorded on 1 September 1967 at London's Advision Studios. The session took six hours to complete. Personnel hired for the session included guitarist John McLaughlin, who later found fame with the Mahavishnu Orchestra; guitarist Big Jim Sullivan, who previously contributed to David Bowie; drummer Andy White; and Tony's then-wife Siegrid, who sang backing vocals. Tony Visconti later expressed disappointment in the finished tracks, stating in 1977, "I think these tracks were the reason David was thrown off Deram. They really were terrible."

Composition
Like "Silly Boy Blue" from David Bowie, "Karma Man" displays Bowie's growing interest in Tibetan Buddhism, which eventually led him and Visconti to join the Tibet Society. According to O'Leary, the song is a tribute to monks in exile such as Chime Rinpoche. The song's main character is presented as a "freak" and is left praying in a carnival tent as an exhibit, living in isolation away from his companions. Featuring a homage to Ray Bradbury's The Illustrated Man (1951), More positive in tone than "Silly Boy Blue", O'Leary analyses the track as a metaphor for "the lama in the West" or a "freak" residing in a faraway area. Bowie described Buddhist monks as "super-human", claiming to Melody Maker that they "could go days without eating, spend months living underground and they could live for centuries", a theme he would revisit for 1977's "Sons of the Silent Age". O'Leary compares these beliefs to the Marvel Comics' character Doctor Strange.

The Buddhist themes are reflected in the music, which O'Leary compares to "Eastern" music. The "syllable-stuffed" verses are in D major while the "richly-harmonized" refrains are in B major. Bowie moves up and down in sharps in the refrains, going from F-D-C-B on "slow down, slow down", to B-D-F on "Karma Man". The song is mostly set in  common time, with the bars before the refrains in  half time. Author Peter Doggett likens Visconti's string arrangement to the orchestration of George Martin on the Beatles' "Eleanor Rigby" (1966). Alex Henderson of AllMusic similarly considered the track "Beatlesque". Doggett considers the song Bowie's "most creative marriages of words and music" up to that point.

Release and aftermath
"Karma Man" was intended for release as a B-side to the proposed singles "Let Me Sleep Beside You" and "When I Live My Dream". After Deram's parent company Decca Records rejected both for release as singles, "Karma Man" remained unreleased until The World of David Bowie compilation, which was issued by Decca on 6 March 1970 to cash-in on Bowie's success with "Space Oddity". Bowie himself approved the tracklisting for the compilation. Before its release, Bowie had played the track for two of his BBC radio sessions on 13 May 1968 and 5 February 1970. The first, which appeared on the Bowie at the Beeb compilation in 2000, featured a lush string arrangement and backing vocals from Visconti and Steve Peregrin Took. O'Leary considers this version superior to the studio recording.

Bowie also offered the song as a potential cover to Manfred Mann, who declined it. A previously unreleased stereo mix of the song was later released on the 2010 deluxe edition of David Bowie. Pegg notes that the song's "slow down, slow down" chorus provided inspiration for English rock band Suede's 1992 single "The Drowners", which starts its chorus with the same words and is sung to the melody of Bowie's "Starman" (1972). He also finds a "melodic echo" of "Karma Man" in Suede's later single "Beautiful Ones" (1996). The band acknowledged Bowie's influence in interviews, which led to an NME interview with Bowie and lead singer Brett Anderson shortly before the release of Bowie's Black Tie White Noise and Suede's self-titled debut album in 1993; this generated publicity for the two artists in the United Kingdom.

Toy version

Bowie re-recorded "Karma Man" during the sessions for the Toy project between July and October 2000, along with other tracks he wrote and recorded in the mid-1960s, including "Let Me Sleep Beside You". The lineup consisted of the members of Bowie's then-touring band: guitarist Earl Slick, bassist Gail Ann Dorsey, pianist Mike Garson, musician Mark Plati and drummer Sterling Campbell. With co-production from Bowie and Plati, the band rehearsed the songs at Sear Sound Studios in New York City before recording them as live tracks. Plati stated that he refused to listen to Bowie's original recordings of the tracks, as so to prevent the originals from influencing his playing on the new versions. Overdubs were recorded at New York's Looking Glass Studios.

Toy was initially intended for release in March 2001, before it was shelved by EMI/Virgin due to financial issues. So, Bowie departed the label and recorded his next album Heathen (2002). On 29 September 2021, Warner Music Group announced that Toy would get an official release on 26 November as part of the box set Brilliant Adventure (1992–2001) through ISO and Parlophone. "Karma Man" and an "alternative ending mix" of "Silly Boy Blue" were released as a single ahead of the release on 15 October. Plati said about the release:

A separate deluxe edition, titled Toy:Box, was released on 7 January 2022, which contains two new mixes of the song: an "alternative mix" and an "Unplugged and Somewhat Slightly Electric" mix, featuring new guitar parts by Plati and Slick. Reviewing Toy, The Independents Helen Brown wrote that the remake has the "same attitude" as the original, although it "nods affectionately back at its [musical and lyrical] roots".

Personnel
According to Chris O'Leary:

Original version
 David Bowie vocals
 John McLaughlin lead guitar
 Big Jim Sullivan acoustic guitar
 Tony Visconti bass, producer
 Andy White drums
 Siegrid Visconti backing vocals
 Unknown musicians celli

Toy version
 David Bowie vocals, producer
 Earl Slick lead guitar
 Gerry Leonard rhythm guitar
 Gail Ann Dorsey bass, backing vocals
 Mike Garson keyboards
 Mark Plati rhythm guitar, producer
 Sterling Campbell drums
 Holly Palmer backing vocals
 Emm Gryner backing vocals
 Unknown musicians violins, violas, celli

Notes

References

Sources

1967 songs
Buddhism in music
David Bowie songs
Song recordings produced by Tony Visconti
Songs written by David Bowie